was a Japanese astronomer and discoverer of minor planets at the Tokyo Astronomical Observatory. Furukawa was also associated with Nagoya University Department of Astrophysics.

Awards and honors 

Asteroid 3425 Hurukawa, a member of the Eos family and discovered by Karl Reinmuth at Heidelberg in 1929, was named in his honor. The official naming citation was published by the Minor Planet Center (MPC) on 16 December 1986.

Discoveries 

Kiichirō Furukawa was a prolific discoverer of asteroids, credited by the MPC under the name K. Hurukawa with a total of 92 co-discovered numbered minor planets, all of them in collaboration with astronomer Hiroki Kosai.

List of discovered minor planets

See also

References 
 

1929 births
2016 deaths
Discoverers of asteroids

20th-century Japanese astronomers